Green Springs Elementary School is the name of two elementary schools in the United States. These include:

 Green Springs Elementary School (Kansas), in Olathe, Kansas
 Green Springs Elementary School (Ohio), in Green Springs, Ohio